Walter Roberts (born February 15, 1942) is a former American football wide receiver and kick return specialist in the National Football League (NFL) for the Cleveland Browns, the New Orleans Saints, and the Washington Redskins.  He lettered in football, baseball and track at Compton High School. He played college football at San Jose State University.  A fast runner, he was nicknamed "the Flea".

Notes

1942 births
Living people
People from Texarkana, Texas
American football wide receivers
Cleveland Browns players
New Orleans Saints players
San Jose State Spartans football players
Washington Redskins players
Players of American football from Texas